The 1983 Virginia Slims of California was a women's tennis tournament played on indoor carpet courts at the Oakland-Alameda County Coliseum Arena in Oakland, California in the United States that was part of the 1983 Virginia Slims World Championship Series. It was the 12th edition of the tournament and was held from February 21 through February 27, 1983. Sixth-seeded Bettina Bunge won the singles title and earned $30,000 first-prize money.

Finals

Singles

 Bettina Bunge defeated  Sylvia Hanika 6–3, 6–3
 It was Bunge's 1st title of the year and the 3rd of her career.

Doubles

 Claudia Kohde-Kilsch /  Eva Pfaff defeated  Rosemary Casals /  Wendy Turnbull 6–4, 4–6, 6–4
 It was Kohde-Kilsch's 1st title of the year and the 8th of her career. It was Pfaff's only title of the year and the 1st of her career.

Prize money

References

External links
 ITF tournament edition details

Virginia Slims of California
Silicon Valley Classic
Virginia Slims of California
Virginia Slims of California
Virginia Slims of California